Kaspar i Nudådalen ("Kaspar in the Nudå Valley") was the Sveriges Television's Christmas calendar in 2001.

Plot 
It's winter in the small village of Nudådalen, where Kasper lives. Living in the village are also his grandfather on his mother's side, general store-operator Atom-Ragnar, Åhman, and Lisa.

Reruns 
Reruns aired at Barnkanalen between 23 December 2009 – 7 January 2010.

Video 
The series was released to VHS and DVD on 24 October 2002.

References

External links 
 

2001 Swedish television series debuts
2001 Swedish television series endings
Sveriges Television's Christmas calendar